Chromosome 7 is one of the 23 pairs of chromosomes in humans, who normally have two copies of this chromosome. Chromosome 7 spans about 160 million base pairs (the building material of DNA) and represents between 5 and 5.5 percent of the total DNA in cells.

Genes

Number of genes 
The following are some of the gene count estimates of human chromosome 7. Because researchers use different approaches to genome annotation their predictions of the number of genes on each chromosome varies (for technical details, see gene prediction). Among various projects, the collaborative consensus coding sequence project (CCDS) takes an extremely conservative strategy. So CCDS's gene number prediction represents a lower bound on the total number of human protein-coding genes.

Gene list 

The following is a partial list of genes on human chromosome 7. For complete list, see the link in the infobox on the right.

Diseases and disorders
The following diseases are some of those related to genes on chromosome 7:

 argininosuccinic aciduria
 cerebral cavernous malformation
 Charcot–Marie–Tooth disease
 Cholestasis, progressive familial intrahepatic 3
 Citrullinemia, type II, adult-onset,
 congenital bilateral absence of vas deferens
 cystic fibrosis<ref name="Hillier 2003"></bn></ref>
 Developmental verbal dyspraxia
 distal spinal muscular atrophy, type V
 Ehlers–Danlos syndrome
 hemochromatosis, type 3
 Hereditary nonpolyposis colorectal cancer HNPCC4
 Lissencephaly syndrome, norman-roberts type
 Marfan syndrome
 maple syrup urine disease
 maturity onset diabetes of the young type 3
 mucopolysaccharidosis type VII or Sly syndrome
 Muscular dystrophy, limb-girdle, type 1D
 myelodysplastic syndrome
 Myotonia congenita
 nonsyndromic deafness
 osteogenesis imperfecta
 p47-phox-deficient chronic granulomatous disease
 Pectus excavatum 
 Pendred syndrome
 Romano–Ward syndrome
 Shwachman–Diamond syndrome
 Schizophrenia
 Silver-Russell syndrome
 Specific language impairment
 Tritanopia or tritanomaly color blindness
 Williams syndrome
 Zellweger syndrome

Chromosomal disorders
The following conditions are caused by changes in the structure or number of copies of chromosome 7:
 Williams syndrome is caused by the deletion of genetic material from a portion of the long (q) arm of chromosome 7. The deleted region, which is located at position 11.23 (written as 7q11.23), is designated as the Williams syndrome critical region. This region includes more than 20 genes, and researchers believe that the characteristic features of Williams syndrome are probably related to the loss of multiple genes in this region.

While a few of the specific genes related to Williams syndrome have been identified, the relationship between most of the genes in the deleted region and the signs and symptoms of Williams syndrome is unknown.
 Other changes in the number or structure of chromosome 7 can cause delayed growth and development, mental disorder, characteristic facial features, skeletal abnormalities, delayed speech, and other medical problems. These changes include an extra copy of part of chromosome 7 in each cell (partial trisomy 7) or a missing segment of the chromosome in each cell (partial monosomy 7). In some cases, several DNA building blocks (nucleotides) are deleted or duplicated in part of chromosome 7. A circular structure called ring chromosome 7 is also possible. A ring chromosome occurs when both ends of a broken chromosome are reunited.

Cytogenetic band

In popular culture

Novels 
In the novel Performance Anomalies, researchers at Stanford University identify mutations in the long (q) arm of chromosome 7 as underlying the accelerated nervous system of the spy protagonist Cono, who receives the moniker Cono 7Q

References

Further reading

External links

 
 

Chromosomes (human)